Gluteal artery (arteria glutea) can refer to:
 Superior gluteal artery
 Inferior gluteal artery